"TYTD" is the third single released by Japanese rock band, The Teenage Kissers. The single was released in a special physical edition July 17, 2013 that comprised only one track and was distributed only at live shows.

Personnel
 Nana Kitade – vocals, lyrics
 Hideo Nekota – bass, music
 Mai Koike – drums
 Tsubasa Nakada – guitar
 TEAK – arrangement

References

External links
 The Teenage Kissers official site

2013 singles
Nana Kitade songs
Songs written by Nana Kitade
2013 songs